Duke Shēn of Chen (reigned 10th century BC) was the second ruler of the ancient Chinese state of Chen during the Western Zhou dynasty. His given name was Xihou (犀侯), and Shēn was his posthumous name.

He succeeded his father Duke Hu of Chen, who married the eldest daughter of King Wu of Zhou. After Duke Shēn's death, he was succeeded by his younger brother, Gaoyang, known as Duke Xiang of Chen. However, when Duke Xiang died, the throne returned to Duke Shēn's son Tu, known as Duke Xiao of Chen.

References

Citations

Sources 
 
 
 

Monarchs of Chen (state)
10th-century BC Chinese monarchs